Alhamra Arts Council (also known as the Alhamra Hall, Alhamra Cultural Complex, Alhamra Art Gallery and Lahore Arts Council) was designed by Nayyar Ali Dada and completed in 1992.

The Alhamra Arts Council is located on a colonial-period road in Lahore, Pakistan, that was formerly known as Mall Road and has been renamed as Shahrah Quaid-e-Azam. The origins of the arts complex lie in an initial commission of Nayyar Ali Dada to design a 1000-seat auditorium for the Alhamra Arts Council (AAC), of which he was a member. The AAC had been given the site by the government in the years immediately following independence but had generally staged its performances outdoors. The auditorium was completed in 1979 and replaced some temporary buildings.

A further three phases of construction followed that of the auditorium. There were commissioned from Dada by the Lahore Arts Council, a government agency that took over the project from the non-governmental Alhamra Arts Council following a dispute concerning ownership of the land. The first of these phases was completed in 1984 and consisted of offices and art galleries housed in four octagonal structures. In the following year, a 450-seat theatre in hexagonal form was added to the existing auditorium and, in 1992, an octagonal 250-seat facility for lectures and recitals was completed. The buildings are placed in a manner that creates semi-enclosed courtyards and the various polygonal shapes in their design are intended to enhance acoustics when used for performances.

The structures are influenced by Mughal architecture and are constructed using a veneer of handmade red bricks overlaying a concrete form. The bricks are bonded with a local mortar and reflect the construction of the historic Lahore Fort and Badshahi Mosque, as well as the red sandstone that was favoured by the Mughals.

The design was a winner of the Aga Khan Award for Architecture in 1998, when the jury described it as "a rare example of flexible spaces that has enabled several additions to be made over time, each of which has in turn enhanced, rather than detracted from, its overall architectural value.

References

External links
 Official website

Lahore Arts Council - Board of Governors

1992 establishments in Pakistan
Arts centres in Pakistan
Art museums and galleries in Pakistan
Architecture of Lahore
Music venues in Pakistan
Organisations based in Lahore
Theatres in Pakistan
Nayyar Ali Dada buildings and structures
The Mall, Lahore